Kempa Airport  was an airstrip serving the village of Kempa in Mai-Ndombe Province, Democratic Republic of the Congo.

Google Earth Historical Imagery shows increasing shrub growth on the runway since (6/15/2009).

See also

 Transport in the Democratic Republic of the Congo
 List of airports in the Democratic Republic of the Congo

References

External links
 Bing Maps - Kempa Airstrip
 HERE Maps - Kempa

Defunct airports
Airports in Mai-Ndombe Province